Niels Julius Heilbuth (October 8, 1906 – June 1, 1992) was a Danish field hockey player who competed in the 1928 Summer Olympics.

He was born in Copenhagen and died in Hørsholm.

In 1928 he was a member of the Danish team which was eliminated in the first round of the Olympic tournament after two wins and two losses.  He played all four matches as forward and scored one goal.

External links
 
 profile

1906 births
1992 deaths
Sportspeople from Copenhagen
Danish male field hockey players
Olympic field hockey players of Denmark
Field hockey players at the 1928 Summer Olympics